The Timbaúba Futebol Clube is a Brazilian football club located in Timbaúba, state of Pernambuco. Currently dispute the Campeonato Pernambucano Série A2.

Stadium
Timbaúba plays their home matches at the Estádio Ferreira Lima which has a capacity of 6,000 seats.

Current squad
According to the CBF register.

Performance competitions

Campeonato Pernambucano - Série A2

Copa Pernambuco

References

External links
 

Football clubs in Pernambuco